Luc Dionne is a Canadian screenwriter and director born in Quebec in 1960.  Luc's work is largely directed towards the French-speaking market.  However, many within the industry accredit Dionne's successful Omerta series as being an inspiration for David Chase's hit series The Sopranos. Another notable television series  produced by Dionne is District 31 since 2016.

Dionne's adaptation of Machine Gun Molly (Monica la mitraille) won the 2005 Genie for best screenplay. He was nominated for the same award in 2006 for Aurore.

Biography

Filmography

As director
 2005 — Aurore
 2010 — The Child Prodigy (L'enfant prodige)
 2012 — Omertà

As screenwriter
 1996 — Omerta 1, The Code of Silence ("Omertà I - The Code of Silence") (TV series)
 1997 — Omerta 2, The Code of Silence ("Omertà II - The Code of Silence") (TV mini-series)
 1999 — Omerta 3, The Last Men of Honor ("Omertà III - The Last Men of Honor) (TV series)
 2000 — Tag, Season I (TV series)
 2002 — The Last Chapter I (The Last Chapter) (TV mini-series)
 2002 — Bunker, le Cirque (TV series))
 2003 — The Last Chapter II: The War Continues (Le Dernier Chapitre II, la Guerre Continue) (TV mini-series)
 2004 — Machine Gun Molly (Monica la mitraille)
 2005 — Aurore
 2010 — The Child Prodigy

References

External links
 
 The Last Chapter, http://www.bfsent.com/lastchapter/bios/dionne.htm#

1960 births
Canadian screenwriters in French
Film directors from Quebec
Living people
Best Screenplay Genie and Canadian Screen Award winners